TECO Maritime Group AS is a specialist supplier of technical services to the maritime industry. TECO offer voyage repair and maintenance services onboard vessels, whilst they are in service. 

TECO Group ASA acquired Davie Shipbuilding of Canada and renamed as Davie Yards Inc in 2006.

References

Business services companies of Norway
Manufacturing companies of Norway
Engineering companies of Norway
Norwegian companies established in 1994
Companies based in Bærum